Luke Christopher Carlin (born December 20, 1980) is an American Canadian former professional baseball catcher. He played in Major League Baseball (MLB) for the San Diego Padres, Arizona Diamondbacks and Cleveland Indians.

Early life
Born in Silver Spring, Maryland, United States, Carlin's family moved to Aylmer, Quebec when he was very young and he played baseball in the province of Quebec, notably for the Quebec Diamants of the Ligue de Baseball Elite du Quebec in 1999, before obtaining a scholarship from Northeastern University, where he played college baseball for the Huskies. In 2001, he played collegiate summer baseball with the Chatham A's of the Cape Cod Baseball League. He was named to the All-Tournament Team at the 2002 America East Tournament, in which the Huskies finished second.

Professional career

Detroit Tigers
He was drafted by the Detroit Tigers in the 10th round of the 2002 Major League Baseball draft and signed his first pro contract on June 18 of the same year and played for the Oneonta Tigers in the New York–Penn League before being released by the Tigers in March 2003.

San Diego Padres
He signed as a free agent with the San Diego Padres in April 2003 and played in their organization for six years with stops with the Eugene Emeralds of the Northwest League (A-) and the Fort Wayne Wizards of the Midwest League (A) in 2003, Fort Wayne and the Lake Elsinore Storm of the California League (A+) in 2004, the Mobile Bay Bears of the Southern League (AA) in 2005, Mobile and the Portland Beavers of the Pacific Coast League (AAA) in 2006 and Portland in 2007 and 2008.

On May 10, Carlin made his MLB debut for the San Diego Padres. On May 16, 2008, he came through with his first MLB hit, which was a double against the Colorado Rockies. He became a free agent at the end of the season and signed a minor league contract with the Arizona Diamondbacks in January .

Pittsburgh Pirates
On January 12, 2010, Carlin signed a minor league contract with the Pittsburgh Pirates with an invitation to spring training.

Cleveland Indians
On August 10, 2010, Carlin was traded to the Cleveland Indians for a player to be named later. His contract was purchased by the Indians from Triple-A Columbus on September 23. Carlin was outrighted to Triple-A Columbus on October 31, removing him from the 40-man roster. Carlin refused his minor league assignment and subsequently filed for free agency. On November 29, 2010, Carlin signed a minor league contract with the Indians; his deal included a non-roster invitation to the Indians' 2011 spring training camp.

Carlin began 2012 with Columbus, hitting .227 in 20 games with 10 RBI before he was called up to Cleveland on May 26 to replace Carlos Santana, who was placed on the 7-day DL.

He was designated for assignment on June 12, and sent to Triple A on June 15.

Coaching career
In January 2018, Carlin was named manager of the Lake County Captains, the single A affiliate of the Cleveland Indians.

References

External links

1980 births
Living people
Águilas Cibaeñas players
American expatriate baseball players in the Dominican Republic
American emigrants to Canada
Arizona Diamondbacks players
Baseball players from Maryland
Baseball people from Quebec
Chatham Anglers players
Cleveland Indians players
Columbus Clippers players
Estrellas Orientales players
Eugene Emeralds players
Fort Wayne Wizards players
Gigantes del Cibao players
Indianapolis Indians players
Iowa Cubs players
Lake Elsinore Storm players
Major League Baseball catchers
Minor league baseball managers
Mobile BayBears players
Nashville Sounds players
Northeastern Huskies baseball players
Oneonta Tigers players
People from Silver Spring, Maryland
Portland Beavers players
Reno Aces players
Salt Lake Bees players
San Diego Padres players
World Baseball Classic players of Canada
2009 World Baseball Classic players